Lauren Hammersley is a Canadian actress known for playing teacher Lisa Mason, the CBC Television sitcom Mr. D.  and Charmaine in Virgin River on Netflix.

Early Life 
Hammersley was born in Campbell River, British Columbia

She was raised in Surrey, British Columbia, Canada.

Career
Hammersley started acting at age 12 in an ad for Fantastic Sand Surprises. In addition to acting, she worked as a photographer until working full time as an actor on Mr. D. in 2012  where she played  Lisa Mason: a competent and responsible former teacher and principal, known for her traditional teaching style. She has a Masters in Education and a PhD in Medieval literature. In the seventh season, she is the school guidance counselor. 

In 2016 she played an alcoholic but functional lawyer in Orphan Black.

In 2019 Hammersley started acting in Virgin River as Charmaine Roberts, who was romantically involved with Jack (Martin Henderson) and became pregnant with his children.

In 2023 it was announced she will act in the mini-series Sullivan's crossing alongside actress Morgan Kohan, Chad Michael Murray and Scott Patterson.

Filmography

Film

Television

References

External links

Actresses from British Columbia
Canadian television actresses
Canadian women comedians
Living people
People from Campbell River, British Columbia
21st-century Canadian actresses
Year of birth missing (living people)